Lee Jeong-gyu may refer to:

 Lee Jeong-gyu (wrestler) (born 1937), South Korean wrestler
 Yi Jeonggyu (1897–1984), Korean anarchist